Borneo Airways  was a regional airline in operation from 1997 to 1999 in Brunei. It is a subsidiary of Royal Brunei Airlines.

History
In 1997, the Borneo Airways brand was revived after Royal Brunei Airlines decided to cease its joint venture with Hornbill Skyways. It set up a partnership with Malaysia-based Corporate Centre Sdn.Bhd, for a new airline based in Malaysia, named Borneo Airways. The company operated via a single Dornier 228; and used Royal Brunei's airline codes and callsign. In 1999, only a year after the first flight, the partner carrier Royal Brunei Airlines indefinitely suspended operations on Borneo Airways' routes between Miri, Victoria and Gunung Mulu National Park in Malaysia and the Brunei capital Bandar Seri Begawan. Operations ceased on 31 August 1999.

Fleet
A single 19-seater Dornier 228 (9M-BOR) leased from Royal Brunei Airlines.

Destinations
 Brunei
 Bandar Seri Begawan - Brunei International Airport - Hub

 Malaysia
 Labuan - Labuan Airport
 Miri - Miri Airport
 Mulu - Mulu Airport

See also
 Royal Brunei Airlines Flight 238 - a regional Royal Brunei flight that crashed in Miri, Malaysia in 1997
 RB Link - established in 2019, a new regional airliner operated under Royal Brunei Airlines

References

External links
 Curtains for Borneo Airways, New Straits Times, 4 September 1999

Airlines established in 1997
Airlines disestablished in 1999
Royal Brunei Airlines